Radkov is a municipality and village in Tábor District in the South Bohemian Region of the Czech Republic. It has about 200 inhabitants.

Administrative parts
The village of Paseka is an administrative part of Radkov.

References

Villages in Tábor District